Sergi Bruguera i Torner (born 16 January 1971) is a former professional tennis player from Spain. He won consecutive men's singles titles at the French Open in 1993 and 1994, a silver medal at the 1996 Olympic Games in men's singles and reached a career-high ranking of No. 3 in August 1994.

Bruguera is the only player to have a winning record against both Roger Federer and Pete Sampras. He won three of his five matches against Sampras: Bruguera leads 1–0 on hard court, 2–1 on clay, and Sampras leads 1–0 on carpet. In their only match, at the 2000 Barcelona Open, Bruguera defeated Federer 6–1, 6–1. By number of games won, the match remains Federer's worst loss in his entire career.

Bruguera was selected to captain the Spain Davis Cup team in 2018. He became coach of Alexander Zverev in May 2022.

Career
Bruguera won a total of 14 top-level singles titles and 3 doubles titles. His career-high singles ranking was World No. 3. He is currently the director of the Bruguera Tennis Academy Top Team.

Early career 
Bruguera was Spain's national junior champion in 1987. He turned professional in 1988. In his first full year on the tour, 1989, he won the Cairo Challenger title as a qualifier, defeating Jordi Arrese in the final, and reached the semifinals in Rome. He reached 4th round in the French Open in 1989 and finished the year ranked world No. 26, and was named the ATP's newcomer of the year.

1990–1994: Clay dominance 
Bruguera earned a reputation as a top clay court player in the early 1990s, reaching singles finals at Gstaad and Geneva, and capturing doubles titles in Hamburg (his 1st ATP Masters 1000 title in doubles) partnering Jim Courier (who would play against Bruguera later in 1993 French Open the men's singles final) in Florence, partnering Horacio de la Peña in 1990; reaching singles finals at Barcelona and Gstaad along with titles in Estoril, Monte Carlo (his 1st ATP Masters 1000 title in singles), and Athens, and a doubles title at Geneva, partnering Marc Rosset in 1991; reaching singles finals at Estoril, Bordeaux, and Athens along with titles in Madrid, Gstaad and Palermo in 1992.

Bruguera rose to even further prominence in 1993. During the French Open, Bruguera reached quarterfinals without dropping a set, including a rare triple bagel (6–0, 6–0, 6–0) at the second round against Thierry Champion, this remains the last time a player recorded a triple bagel in a singles match at a Grand Slam event. He then defeated Pete Sampras in 4 sets and Andrei Medvedev in straight sets in the semifinals, Bruguera reached his first Grand Slam final at the French Open, where he faced two-time defending champion and then World No. 2 Jim Courier. Courier was overwhelmingly favoured to win his third title, but ultimately Bruguera won a gruelling five-set final that lasted 4 hours, becoming the first Spaniard to win French Open since Andrés Gimeno in 1972. It was also the last time a man won a Grand Slam singles title with wins over both of the top two seeds until Stanislas Wawrinka won the Australian Open in 2014. He continued his top clay court player reputation by reaching finals at Milan (his first final on Carpet), Barcelona, Madrid, and Palermo, while capturing an additional 4 titles at Monte Carlo (his 2nd ATP Masters 1000 title in singles), Gstaad, Prague, and Bordeaux (his 1st hard court title) besides Roland Garros. He finished the year ranked World No. 4.

In 1994 Bruguera maintained his dominance on clay and successfully defended his title at the French Open while only dropping 2 sets in the entire tournament, defeating, once again, Medvedev in straight sets in the quarterfinals and Courier in 4 sets in the semifinals, along with fellow Spaniard Alberto Berasategui in 4 sets in the final. He reached finals at Dubai (his 2nd hard court final), Monte Carlo (his 3rd ATP Masters 1000 final in singles), and Madrid, and captured titles at Gstaad and Prague besides Roland Garros. In August he reached his career-high ranking of World No. 3 and finished the year ranked World No. 4. He was the first Spaniard to finish 2 consecutive years in Top 5. It is also his 4th consecutive year winning at least 3 clay titles in singles.

Between 1990–1994 he reached 25 top-level clay tournament finals in singles and 3 top-level clay tournament finals in doubles, out of which he captured 13 clay titles in singles and 3 clay titles in doubles.

1995 
With Thomas Muster "officially" starting his reign as the new King of Clay, Bruguera was not able to keep up his dominance on clay like he did the previous years, but was still able to play at a decent level. Coming into 1995 French Open as the two-time defending champion, he only dropped one set en route to semifinals, where he was defeated by 1989 French Open champion Michael Chang in tight straight sets (4–6, 6–7, 6–7), ending his 19-match win streak at Roland Garros. He only reached 1 top-level final, which is his 4th Masters 1000 final, his first in Rome (on clay), where he was defeated in 4 sets by Muster. In December, he tore 2 ligaments on his right ankle while training, which put him in an even worse condition and prevented him to make any significant impact during 1996 season.

1996: Ankle injury 
He returned to competitive playing in February, having not yet fully recovered from the injury. In 1996 French Open Bruguera was taken out by Sampras in an epic 5-set match in the second round. The highlight of the year was when Bruguera won the men's singles silver medal at the 1996 Olympic Games in Atlanta. He was defeated in straight sets in the final by Andre Agassi. It was also the only top-level final he reached this year. His Year-End Ranking slipped from previous year's No. 13 to No. 81 much thanks to his injuries.

1997: Comeback 
Opening 1997 Bruguera was the first ever opponent of Lleyton Hewitt in the main draw of a Grand Slam tournament, at the Australian Open. Bruguera defeated him in straight sets.

This year Bruguera returned strongly from injury previous season and reached finals at Milan, Key Biscaine (his 5th Masters final and his 1st on hard), and Umag. Bruguera also played an excellent tournament at the French Open reaching the final for the third time, en route to the final he defeated former champion and 2nd Seed Michael Chang in the fourth round, then rising star and future World No. 1 Patrick Rafter in the semifinals. But an almost unknown Brazilian player ranked No. 66 named Gustavo Kuerten, who defeated two former champions and notable players en route to the final, defeated Bruguera in straight sets without much effort, although Bruguera was heavily favoured to win his 3rd title at Roland Garros.

Bruguera earned the ATP's Comeback Player of Year award in 1997 after returning from an ankle injury the previous year and improving his Year-End Ranking from World No. 81 to World No. 8.

Later career 
After 1997, due to injuries, Bruguera was far from his best game. He lost concentration and started to increase his errors during his matches, losing one of his great virtues, his solid style. From 1998 until his retirement the three remarkable showings were the final (1999) and the title (2000) in the Challenger Open Castilla y León (considered best challenger tournament of the world by this date) and the final in San Marino in 2000.

Outside tennis career 
Bruguera is a long-time fan of the Los Angeles Lakers and would often attend their games while playing at tournaments in the United States. During Miami Masters on 28 March 1997, right after the semifinals where he defeated world No. 1 Sampras, Bruguera sank three shots (layup, free throw, top of key) during a time-out of a game between the Lakers and the Miami Heat to earn US$500. This money was given to ATP Charities in his name. Bruguera has also played semi-professional football in his native Spain.

In a 2006 interview featuring questions from fans by the BBC Sport website, a question was asked about the frequent comparisons between Roger Federer and Sampras. In his reply, Bruguera claimed that Federer is ten times better than Sampras.

Significant finals

Grand Slam finals

Singles: 3 (2–1)

Olympic Games finals

Singles: 1 (1 silver medal)

Masters Series finals

Singles: 5 (2–3)

Doubles: 1 (1–0)

ATP career finals

Singles: 35 (14 titles, 21 runner-ups)

Doubles: 3 (3–0)

Singles performance timeline

1. Bruguera withdrew due to a lower back injury at Round Robin Stage after playing the first 2 matches, and was replaced by then World No. 10 Tim Henman.

Top 10 wins

Records

References

External links
 
 
 
 Bruguera Tennis Academy

Tennis players from Catalonia
French Open champions
Olympic medalists in tennis
Olympic silver medalists for Spain
Olympic tennis players of Spain
Spanish male tennis players
Tennis players from Barcelona
Tennis players at the 1992 Summer Olympics
Tennis players at the 1996 Summer Olympics
1971 births
Living people
Grand Slam (tennis) champions in men's singles
Medalists at the 1996 Summer Olympics
Masters tennis players